Harrison is an unincorporated community in Mineral County, West Virginia, United States. Harrison is located on the Potomac River across from Shallmar, Maryland.

The community was named in honor of Benjamin Harrison (1833–1901), the 23rd President of the United States (1889–1893).

References

Unincorporated communities in Mineral County, West Virginia
Unincorporated communities in West Virginia
Coal towns in West Virginia